Chhloung is a district of Kratié Province, Cambodia.

Communes and villages

References 

Districts of Kratié province